....The Answer to Both Your Questions is a 1996 debut EP by Something for Kate. The EP reportedly title came from the bands' frontman Paul Dempsey asking a friend for suggestions for what to name the EP. His response was, "The answer to both your questions is 'Porn'". Although Dempsey did not take this advice, he thought the answer was "a good title".

Track listing

Personnel 

Julian Carroll – bass guitar
Clint Hyndman – drums
Paul Dempsey – vocals, guitar
Sophie Wheeler – cello
Recorded – Greg Atkinson, Lawrence Maddy, Tamas Spencer
Mixed – Greg Atkinson
Mastered – Wayne Baptist

References

1996 debut EPs
EPs by Australian artists
Something for Kate EPs
Murmur (record label) EPs